Barry Moir is a retired tennis player from South Africa. His highest ranking was 92 in the world, obtained in 1986. He is the brother of Kevin Moir.

Challenger titles

Singles: (3)

Doubles: (1)

References

French Open junior champions
South African male tennis players
South African people of British descent
White South African people
Living people
Tennis players from Johannesburg
Grand Slam (tennis) champions in boys' doubles
1963 births